Eupithecia praesignata is a moth in the family Geometridae. It is found in Afghanistan, Uzbekistan, Tajikistan, Kyrgyzstan, north-western China (Xinjiang), Jammu & Kashmir and India (the Ladakh Mountains).

References

Moths described in 1893
praesignata
Moths of Asia